A total solar eclipse occurred at the Moon's descending node of the orbit in North America on February 26, 1979.

A solar eclipse is an astronomical phenomenon that occurs when the Moon passes between Earth and the Sun, thereby totally or partly obscuring the image of the Sun for a viewer on Earth. A total solar eclipse occurs when the Moon's apparent diameter is larger than the Sun's, blocking all direct sunlight, turning day into darkness. Totality occurs in a narrow path across Earth's surface, with the partial solar eclipse visible over a surrounding region thousands of kilometres wide. Occurring only 18 hours and 35 minutes after perigee (Perigee on February 25, 1979 at 22:19 UTC), the Moon's apparent diameter was larger.

The central shadow of the moon passed through the American states of Washington, Oregon, Idaho, Montana (where totality covered almost the entire state), and North Dakota, the Canadian provinces Saskatchewan, Manitoba, Ontario, and Quebec, the  Northwest Territories of Canada (the portion that is now Nunavut), and Greenland.

Visibility

United States
Many visitors traveled to the Pacific Northwest to view the Monday morning eclipse, as it was the last chance to view a total solar eclipse in the contiguous United States for 38 years, 5 months, 26 days. The next opportunity was on August 21, 2017.

Although the path of totality passed through Portland shortly after sunrise (maximum at  it was not directly observable due to overcast skies in northwestern Oregon.

Canada
About a half hour later, the path of totality was in Manitoba and passed through cloudless Winnipeg in the late morning, maximum was at  The greatest eclipse occurred seven minutes later at 10:55 am CST. 

Canada's next total solar eclipse took place on August 1, 2008.  Canada will not see another total solar eclipse until April 8, 2024.

In literature 
Writer Annie Dillard viewed the eclipse from the Yakima Valley, in central Washington State.  She described her impressions of the eclipse in an essay, "Total Eclipse," first published in the magazine Antaeus and then in her collection, Teaching a Stone to Talk (1982). It was later selected for inclusion in The Best American Essays of the [20th] Century (2000).  Dillard describes a nearly overwhelming emotional experience, as suggested in this quotation: "I pray you will never see anything more awful in the sky."  Describing the reactions of other onlookers, she relates "I heard screams."

The 1979 eclipse was also referenced in the opening pages of Douglas Coupland's novel, Generation X.

Related eclipses 
A partial lunar eclipse occurred on March 13, 1979, 15 days later, visible over Africa, Europe and Asia. 177 days later after the total solar eclipse of February 26, 1979, occurred an annular solar eclipse on August 22, 1979. A total lunar eclipse followed on September 6, 1979. 355 days after the total solar eclipse of February 26, 1979, occurred a total solar eclipse on February 16, 1980.

Eclipses in 1979 
 A total solar eclipse on Monday, 26 February 1979.
 A partial lunar eclipse on Tuesday, 13 March 1979.
 An annular solar eclipse on Wednesday, 22 August 1979.
 A total lunar eclipse on Thursday, 6 September 1979.

Solar eclipses of 1979–1982

Saros 120

Metonic cycle

Notes

References 

 eclipse.org.uk Total Eclipse of the Sun: 1979 February 26
 Predictions for the 1979 solar eclipse Royal Astronomical Society of Canada, Journal, vol. 72, June 1978, pp. 149–161 Fred Espenak

External links
Photos/observations:
 Eclipse Chaser's Journal: Part 1, My First Total Solar Eclipse: February 26. 1979, Jeffrey R. Charles
 http://nicmosis.as.arizona.edu:8000/ECLIPSE_WEB/ECLIPSE_79/ECLIPSE_79.html
 1979 Solar Eclipse – ABC News Coverage Excerpts from an ABC News Special Report that aired at 11:00–11:29 a.m. EST on Monday, Feb. 26, 1979 
 1979 Total Solar Eclipse Report on CBS News with Walter Cronkite The February 26, 1979 total solar eclipse story as reported on the CBS Evening News with Walter Cronkite.
 Solar Eclipse Photo Gallery 1, 1970 – 1984 Fred Espenak
 Solar eclipse 1979, Manitoba, Canada

1979 02 26
1979 02 26
1979 in science
February 1979 events